Shon or Shôn is a given name. Notable people with the name include:

Shon Boublil, Canadian guitarist
Shon Jimenez, {born 1970}, American football player
Shon Coleman (born 1991), American football player
Shôn Dale-Jones, writer and performer
Shon Faye, British writer
Shon Gables, American newscaster
Shon Greenblatt (born 1967), American actor
Shon Harris (1968–2014), American author
Shon Hopwood (born 1975), American lawyer and convicted felon
Shon J. Manasco (born 1970), American businessman, United States Under Secretary of the Air Force
Shon McCarthy, curator
Shon Siemonek,  New Zealand-born rugby union player
Shon Weissman (born 1996), Israeli footballer

See also
Shon (Korean surname), surnames are typically listed first in Korean names
Sean, given name
List of people named Sean
Shaun, includes list of people with given name Shaun
Shawn (given name), includes list of people with given name Shawn